Hendry County is a county in the Florida Heartland region of the U.S. state of Florida. As of the 2020 census, the population was 39,619, down from 42,022 at the 2010 census. Its county seat is LaBelle.

Hendry County comprises the Clewiston, Micropolitan Statistical Area.

History
Indigenous peoples migrated into Florida around 10000 B.C.E., while the Glades culture existed in southern Florida from approximately 500 B.C.E. to 1500 C.E. Archaeological sites attesting to the presence of the Glades culture in modern-day Hendry County include Clewiston Mounds, Maple Mound, South Lake Mounds, and Tony's Mound. When Europeans arrived in Florida in the 16th century, the Calusa and Mayaimi tribes resided in Southwest Florida and around Lake Okeechobee.

In the early 1800s, French trader Pierre Denaud established a trading post in the modern-day LaBelle area. During the Seminole Wars, United States troops built a fort along the Caloosahatchee River in 1838, named Fort Denaud in his honor. About three years later, Fort Thompson was established. These military posts became the first permanent settlements in modern-day Hendry County. Originally, the area now comprising Hendry County remained relatively inaccessible, as the Florida Everglades covered more than half of the county's present-day boundaries. Further, nearly the entire area became submerged with water seasonally; thus, only cattle-grazing was a suitable industry. However, by 1881, the Atlantic and Gulf Coast and Okeechobee Land Company began draining the land after entering into a contract with the trustees of the internal improvement fund. The county's first post office was established at Fort Thomson in 1884. The state of Florida established Lee County in 1887, which included land now part of Hendry County. Settlement in LaBelle began around 1889 or 1890, after the town was platted by Francis A. Hendry, a cattle rancher, politician, and officer in the Confederate States Army during the American Civil War.

Around the beginning of the 20th century, commercial fishermen began building fishing camps along Lake Okeechobee at Sand Point, later renamed Clewiston, though the city was not permanently settled until about 1920. In 1911, LaBelle became the oldest municipality in modern-day Hendry County after officially incorporating. That same year, the United States government established the Big Cypress Indian Reservation in present-day Hendry County via executive order by President William Howard Taft. By the early 1920s, residents in the eastern Lee County communities of Clewiston, Felda, Fort Denaud, and LaBelle began campaigning for the creation of a new county. Among their reasons for supporting the establishment of a new county was dissatisfaction with the distance between eastern Lee County settlements and the county seat, Fort Myers. Around that time, the Caloosahatchee Current was established to prove that the area could sustain a newspaper publication.

On May 11, 1923, just three days after neighboring Collier County was also created and partitioned from Lee County, the Florida Legislature voted to establish Hendry County, named after Francis A. Hendry. The first county commissioners were M.F. Boisclaire, M.E. Forrey, Thomas O'Brien, R.H. Magill, and L.N. Thomas. The town of LaBelle (chartered as a city in 1925) was designated as the county seat. A temporary jail was erected at a city park in LaBelle, while E.E. Goodno, who owned the Everett Hotel, allowed rooms and office space in the building to be used as a temporary courthouse.

Residents voted by a wide margin in favor of a $530,000 bond issue in November 1924, with $430,000 to be allotted towards improvement of roads and $100,000 for construction of a courthouse. The courthouse was finished in 1927, and has been listed in the National Register of Historic Places since 1990. In 1925, the only other incorporated municipality in Hendry County, Clewiston, became a city. In mid-1926, a cross-state highway (initially designated as State Road 25, but later renumbered 80) linking Fort Myers to Palm Beach was completed and passed through Hendry County. Around this time, the Gulf Atlantic Transportation, based in LaBelle, began providing transportation from Fort Myers to West Palm Beach. Another improvement to transportation occurred when the Seaboard–All Florida Railway started its rail service from LaBelle to Fort Myers in mid-1927. The 1926 Miami hurricane and 1928 Okeechobee hurricane both impacted Hendry County, though damage and loss of life was significantly less than in other areas around Lake Okeechobee.

The Number 5 British Flying Training School was operated at Riddle Field in Clewiston during World War II, with more than 1,800 Royal Air Force pilots trained there. Upon completion of the Herbert Hoover Dike in 1961, a dedication ceremony was held in Clewiston, which included a speech by former president Herbert Hoover.

Geography
The county borders Lake Okeechobee; the Lake Okeechobee Scenic Trail runs through Hendry County.

Adjacent counties

 Glades County - north
 Martin County - northeast
 Palm Beach County - east
 Broward County - southeast
 Collier County - south
 Lee County - west
 Charlotte County - west

Demographics

As of the 2020 United States census, there were 39,619 people, 12,878 households, and 9,378 families residing in the county.

As of the census of 2000, there were 36,210 people, 10,850 households, and 8,137 families residing in the county. There were 12,294 housing units at an average density of 11 per square mile (4/km2). The racial makeup of the county was 66.08% White, 14.75% Black or African American, 0.80% Native American, 0.45% Asian, 0.03% Pacific Islander, 14.67% from other races, and 3.22% from two or more races. 39.59% of the population were Hispanic or Latino of any race.

In 2000 there were 10,850 households, out of which 40.2% had children under the age of 18 living with them, 55.7% were married couples living together, 12.5% had a female householder with no husband present, and 25.0% were non-families. 18.6% of all households were made up of individuals, and 7.3% had someone living alone who was 65 years of age or older. The average household size was 3.09 and the average family size was 3.44.

In the county, the population was spread out, with 30.0% under the age of 18, 13.3% from 18 to 24, 28.3% from 25 to 44, 18.3% from 45 to 64, and 10.1% who were 65 years of age or older. The median age was 30 years. For every 100 females, there were 125.0 males. For every 100 females age 18 and over, there were 131.4 males.

The median income for a household in the county was $33,592, and the median income for a family was $34,902. Males had a median income of $25,896 versus $20,070 for females. The per capita income for the county was $13,663. About 16.9% of families and 24.1% of the population were below the poverty line, including 29.9% of those under age 18 and 15.0% of those age 65 or over.

2010 Census

In 2010 the population of Hendry Country was 39,140. The racial and ethnic composition of the population was 34.9% non-Hispanic white, 13.4% black or African American, 1.7% Native American, 0.7% Asian, 0.1% Pacific Islander, 0.1% non-Hispanic reporting some other race, 2.7% reporting two or more races and 49.2% Hispanic or Latino.

Politics

Voter registration
According to the Secretary of State's office, Republicans are a plurality of registered voters in Hendry County.

Education
The School Board of Hendry County (SBHC) oversees public primary and secondary education for students in Hendry County. The SBHC maintains six elementary schools, with three each in Clewiston and LaBelle, and two middle schools, with one in Clewiston and the other in LaBelle. The county has two high schools – Clewiston High School and LaBelle High School. Additionally, the SBHC operates the Montura Early Learning Center, a Pre-K learning institute. There is also a tribal school affiliated with the Bureau of Indian Education (BIE), Ahfachkee School at the Big Cypress Indian Reservation.

The Clewiston Public Library in Clewiston, the Harlem Library, also in Clewiston and the Barron Library in Labelle, all make up the Hendry County Library Cooperative. The Clewiston Public Library, now known as the Harry T. Vaughn Library, came about in 1941 when the mayor at the time, asked the Garden Club to organize a library. They enlisted the help of a librarian from the Moore Haven High School to cataloged all the books and then prepared to open the library to the public. In 1967, the library moved to its permanent location, and in 1992, it was added to through funding from state and federal grants, the City of Clewiston, Hendry County, $100,000 from U.S. Sugar, and $57,510 from private donations. The mission of the cooperative, as taken from their website, is this: "The mission of the Hendry County Library Cooperative is to provide its citizens with access to materials and information for work, school, and personal life that are both educational and entertaining".

Few post-secondary institutions exist in Hendry County. Florida SouthWestern State College has an outreach program campus in LaBelle. Neighboring Collier and Lee counties have several colleges and universities, including Ave Maria University in Ave Maria and campuses of Barry University, Florida SouthWestern State College, Keiser University, and Rasmussen University in Fort Myers. In western Palm Beach County, a campus of Palm Beach State College is located in Belle Glade.

Archaeology
 Tony's Mound

Communities

Cities
 Clewiston
 LaBelle

Census-designated places
 Fort Denaud
 Harlem
 Montura
 Pioneer
 Port LaBelle

Other unincorporated communities
 Felda
 Flaghole
 Ladeca Acres

Transportation

Roads

  U.S. Route 27
  Florida State Road 29
  Florida State Road 78
  Florida State Road 80

Airports
 Airglades Airport
 LaBelle Municipal Airport

In popular culture
 In Carl Hiaasen's novel Skinny Dip, agribusiness executive "Red" Hammernut has his offices in LaBelle, and owns significant areas of farmland in Hendry County.
 A scene from Just Cause (film), a 1995 suspense crime thriller film directed by Arne Glimcher and starring Sean Connery and Laurence Fishburne, was filmed in Fort Denaud, Florida.

See also
 Florida Heartland
 National Register of Historic Places listings in Hendry County, Florida

Notes

References

External links

Government links/constitutional offices
 Hendry County Board of County Commissioners official website
 Hendry County Economic Development Council
 Hendry County Supervisor of Elections
 Hendry County Property Appraiser
 Hendry County Sheriff's Office
 Hendry County Tax Collector

Special districts
 Hendry County Public Schools
 Hendry Soil and Water Conservation District
 South Florida Water Management District

Judicial branch
 Hendry County Clerk of Courts
  Public Defender, 20th Judicial Circuit of Florida serving Charlotte, Collier, Glades, Hendry, and Lee Counties
 Office of the State Attorney, 20th Judicial Circuit of Florida 
 Circuit and County Court for the 20th Judicial Circuit of Florida

Tourism links
 Hendry County Tourism

Museum and Library Resources
 The Caloosa Belle, the local newspaper for Hendry County, Florida fully and openly available in the Florida Digital Newspaper Library

 
Florida counties
1923 establishments in Florida
Micropolitan areas of Florida
Populated places established in 1923